Sana Bukas pa ang Kahapon (Lit: I Wish Yesterday Were Still Tomorrow; English: Tomorrow Belongs to Me) is a 2014 Philippine melodrama television series directed by Jerome C. Pobocan and Trina N. Dayrit, starring Bea Alonzo, Paulo Avelino and Albert Martinez, with Maricar Reyes, together with an ensemble cast. The drama was named after the 1983 film of the same name, courtesy of Viva Films. The series was aired on ABS-CBN and worldwide on The Filipino Channel from June 16, 2014 to October 10, 2014, replacing The Legal Wife.

List of Episodes

References

Lists of Philippine drama television series episodes